Methylphenethylamine may refer to:

 α-Methylphenethylamine (amphetamine)
 β-Methylphenethylamine
 N-Methylphenethylamine (an endogenous trace amine in humans)
 2-Methylphenethylamine
 3-Methylphenethylamine
 4-Methylphenethylamine

See also
Phenethylamine, with the organic chemistry name phenyl-ethyl-amine